Werauhia latissima is a plant species in the genus Werauhia. This species is native to Costa Rica.

References

latissima
Flora of Costa Rica